Mia Zschocke (born 28 May 1998) is a German handball player for Storhamar HE and the German national team.

She participated at the 2018 European Women's Handball Championship.

References

External links

1998 births
Living people
German female handball players
People from Aschaffenburg
Sportspeople from Lower Franconia
21st-century German women